Events in the year 1335 in Norway.

Incumbents
Monarch: Magnus VII Eriksson

Events
Marriage between King Magnus VII and Blanche of Namur.

Arts and literature

Births

Deaths

References

Norway